The GITAM School of Architecture, Visakhapatnam (GSA) is a constituent institute of Gandhi Institute of Technology and Management located  in Visakhapatnam, India, specializing education and research in the field of architecture. It was established in 2011.

Academics

It offers Bachelor of Architecture (B. Arch.) and Master of Architecture (M. Arch.).

Admission

Admissions to the under graduate programme is through the Joint Entrance Examination (JEE) or NATA conducted by the Council of Architecture. Foreign nationals, non-resident Indians (NRIs) and persons of Indian origin (PIOs) candidates are eligible to apply and should have qualifications from the foreign boards/universities recognized as equivalent by the Association of Indian Universities (AIU) to be shortlisted for further evaluations.

Facilities

The present campus has two non A.C. hostels which are in the campus. One is for boys, another for girls.

Library

Both GSA Library and Knowledge Resource Centre in GITAM holds knowledge resources predominantly related to architecture. The entire library collection including the CD-ROM and online databases which are made available through the institute’s network. Users can access the online databases, Digital library and find out the real-time availability of library materials from their own computer terminals. The library offers a high range of information services set to the highest professional standards. The library resource includes over 300 books which are related to fields of architecture, 75 journals (25 foreign and 50 Indian) specific to the academic and research needs of the academic community and over 5000 selective e-journals in full-text.

See also
 List of institutions of higher education in Andhra Pradesh
 School of Planning and Architecture, Vijayawada
 Ministry of Human Resource Development

References

External links 

Educational institutions established in 2011
2011 establishments in Andhra Pradesh
Gandhi Institute of Technology and Management